Janet Marion Leathem is a New Zealand psychology academic specializing in traumatic brain injury. She is currently a full professor at Massey University.

Academic career
After a 1975 MSc thesis titled  'The assessment of laterality'  and a 1980 PhD titled  'Some Aspects of Cortical Functioning in Man,'  both at Victoria University of Wellington, Leathem moved to Massey University, where she rose to full professor.

Leathem has spoken out about memory loss, in relation to the John Banks and Kim Dotcom scandal, and the way concussion is handled in rugby union.

Selected works

References

External links
 
 

Living people
Year of birth missing (living people)
New Zealand women academics
Victoria University of Wellington alumni
Academic staff of the Massey University
New Zealand psychologists
New Zealand women psychologists
People from Wellington City
New Zealand women writers